

World Championships

Olympic Games

UCI World Cup

Single day races (1.9.1 and 1.9.2)

Source

Stage races (2.9.1 and 2.9.2)

Source

Continental Championships

Asian Championships

European Championships (under-23)

References

See also
 2004 in men's road cycling

 
 
Women's road cycling by year